Spin the bottle is a party game.

Spin the bottle may also refer to:

Films and television
 Spin the Bottle (2000 film), a 2000 film
 Spin the Bottle (2003 film), a 2003 film
 "Spin the Bottle" (Angel), a 2002 episode of the TV series Angel
 "Spin the Bottle", a Season 11 episode of SpongeBob SquarePants

Music
 Spin the Bottle (album), an album by The Blackeyed Susans
 Spin The Bottle (KISS tribute album)
 "Spin the Bottle", a song from Juliana Hatfield's 1993 album Become What You Are
 Spin the Bottle 1957 recording by Benny Joy
 A 2010 single by The Stunners

Other uses
 Spin The Bottle (media company), an NYC-based production company
 Spin the Bottle, a 1964 book by John Gardner